Nointel – Mours is a railway station in Nointel (Val-d'Oise department), France. It is on the Épinay-Villetaneuse–Le Tréport-Mers railway, between Épinay-Villetaneuse and Persan-Beaumont. The station is used by Transilien line H trains from Paris to Persan-Beaumont. The daily number of passengers was between 500 and 2,500 in 2002. The station was opened in 1877, along with the Épinay-Villetaneuse – Montsoult-Maffliers – Persan-Beaumont section of the Épinay-Le Tréport Line. It was first exploited by the Compagnie des chemins de fer du Nord.

Bus routes

Haut Val d'Oise: 63 and 64

References

External links
 

Railway stations in France opened in 1877
Railway stations in Val-d'Oise